Villarreal (Vila Real in Portuguese) is a village located on the Guadiana river in the municipality of Olivenza, Spain.

History
In the thirteenth century, King Sancho I of Portugal awarded the village to the military Order of Aviz, with Gonçalo Viegas being the commander of the area.

Territorial dispute
Villarreal lies on the disputed section of the Portugal–Spain border, in front of the fortified villages of Juromenha and Alandroal. Historically it belonged not as now to Olivenza, but to Juromenha, and was called Aldeia da Ribeira. After its incorporation into the Kingdom of Spain, it became a pedanía in the municipality of Olivenza.

References

Populated places in the Province of Badajoz
Territorial disputes of Spain
Territorial disputes of Portugal